Shijing Subdistrict  is a subdistrict of Baiyun District, Guangzhou, People's Republic of China.

See also
List of township-level divisions of Guangdong

References 

Township-level divisions of Guangdong
Baiyun District, Guangzhou
Subdistricts of the People's Republic of China